Hao Huang is a mathematician known for solving the sensitivity conjecture. Huang is currently an associate professor in the mathematics department at National University of Singapore.

Huang was an assistant professor from 2015 to 2021 in the Department of Mathematics at Emory University. He obtained his Ph.D in mathematics from UCLA in 2012 advised by Benny Sudakov. His postdoctoral research was done at the Institute for Advanced Study in Princeton and DIMACS at Rutgers University in 2012-2014, followed by a year at the Institute for Mathematics and its Applications at University of Minnesota.

In July 2019, Huang announced a breakthrough, which gave a proof of the sensitivity conjecture. At that point the conjecture had been open for nearly 30 years, having been posed by Noam Nisan and Mario Szegedy in 1992.

Theoretical computer scientist Scott Aaronson said of Huang's ingenious two-page proof, "I find it hard to imagine that even God knows how to prove the Sensitivity Conjecture in any simpler way than this."

Huang received an NSF Career Award in 2019 and a Sloan Research Fellowship in 2020.

References

External links

Year of birth missing (living people)
Living people
Academic staff of the National University of Singapore
Emory University faculty
Sloan Research Fellows
Peking University alumni
University of California, Los Angeles alumni
University of Minnesota alumni
21st-century Chinese mathematicians
Combinatorialists